Bronebakk is a Norwegian surname. Notable people with the surname include:

Jørg Willy Bronebakk (born 1947), Norwegian diplomat
Kristin Bølgen Bronebakk (1950–2012), Norwegian civil servant

Norwegian-language surnames